Poppasquash Farms Historic District is a historic district in Bristol, Rhode Island.  It was added to the National Register of Historic Places in 1980.

The area was occupied by Wampanoag Indians for hundreds of years and eventually settled by British colonists in the 17th century after King Philip's War.  There is a broad array of architecture in the district including Greek Revival and Colonial houses.

See also 
 National Register of Historic Places listings in Bristol County, Rhode Island

References

External links

 National Register nomination form

Historic districts in Bristol County, Rhode Island
Bristol, Rhode Island
Historic districts on the National Register of Historic Places in Rhode Island